"Is This Christmas?" is a single  by English indie pop band The Wombats.

"Is This Christmas?" was the first single released since the singles from the album The Wombats Proudly Present: A Guide to Love, Loss and Desperation. It is released under 14th Floor Records, and was available on Vinyl, CD and through iTunes. It originally appeared on the second edition of compilation The Best Kids Christmas Album in the World Ever Ever!!!, released 10 December 2007 on KIDS Records.

All proceeds of the single were put towards the charity MENCAP. The single features comedian Les Dennis in the introduction of the song.

Music video
A music video was produced to promote the single.

Track listings

Chart performance

Release history

References

2007 singles
The Wombats songs
Christmas charity singles
14th Floor Records singles
2007 songs
Songs written by Matthew Murphy
Songs written by Tord Øverland Knudsen
Songs written by Dan Haggis
British Christmas songs